Yeosuana aromativorans is a species of non-motile aerobic marine bacterium that can degrade benzopyrene. It was first isolated from Gwangyang Bay and forms yellow-brown colonies requiring chlorides of both magnesium and calcium.

References

Hydrocarbon-degrading bacteria
Bacteria described in 2006